Mississippi Aquarium is a nonprofit public aquarium located in Gulfport, Mississippi; it opened August 29, 2020. The  complex incorporates both indoor and outdoor habitats with more than 200 species of animals and 50 species of native plants. Construction costs were paid through federal, state, local, and private consortiums.

Construction
Groundbreaking ceremonies for the aquarium were held on May 11, 2018. The lead designer of the aquarium was Eley Guild Hardy Architects of Biloxi, with assistance from PGAV Destinations of St. Louis, and Brown, Mitchell & Alexander, Inc. (consulting engineers) of Gulfport/Biloxi.

Funding for the US$93 million construction project – land acquisition, facility design, and construction – was achieved through public and private collaboration. Up to 90% of financial backing came from the City of Gulfport, the State of Mississippi, RESTORE Act grants, and funds from the Gulf of Mexico Energy Act.  Private donations through the Mississippi Aquarium Foundation accounted for the remaining 10% of funding.

Mission
The mission of the Mississippi Aquarium is:

Features and exhibits
Distinct features at the aquarium entrance and emblazoned on its logo are three sails that represent three pillars of the aquarium – education, conservation, and community.

Current and proposed exhibits include:

Crocodile habitat
Habitat of river fish
Habitat of North American river otter
Habitat of bottlenose dolphin
Aviary
360-degree acrylic underwater tunnel
Bait ball habitat
Habitat of bottom dwellers
Visitor interaction with invertebrates
Visitor interaction with sharks and rays
Penguin habitat
Habitat of the Gulf Community

The aquarium complex contains landscaped footpaths that are lined with native plants from seven physiographic regions of Mississippi.

See also
List of aquaria in the United States

References

External links
Mississippi Aquarium video tour

Tourist attractions in Harrison County, Mississippi
Buildings and structures in Gulfport, Mississippi
Aquaria in the United States
Zoos in Mississippi
Non-profit organizations based in Mississippi